Nancy Naigle  s an American author known for her works published by Montlake Romance, St. Martin’s Press, Center Point Large Print, Hallmark Publishing, Waterbook (a division of Penguin Random House), and Crossroads Publishing House. Naigle was born in Virginia Beach and currently resides in North Carolina.

Early life
In grade school, Naigle wanted to be a zoologist in charge of creating habitats at the zoo in Washington, D.C. However, once graduating from Kempsville High school out of Virginia, she landed in the information technology field and eventually took a job with Bank of America which led to a successful career as a Senior Vice President.

Beyond her love for animals and her success in the financial world, Naigle grew up in a creative environment. Her mother was a poet with a couple of songs recorded. Her creative roots surfaced once Naigle found herself in some of life’s rough patches. It was books by authors such as Jayne Ann Krentz that provided solace for her dark times. “Those books got me from bad to good. They inspired me to write something that could give another woman some strength, a break, or hope. I can’t solve world hunger, but maybe, just maybe, I can solve a bad day for someone else.”

Career
In 2003, Naigle made the firm decision to pursue writing balancing her writing with her position at the Bank of America. In 2011, she published her first novel, Sweet Tea and Secrets, a contemporary romance with a dash of suspense, which kicked off her popular Adams Grove series. Sweet Tea and Secrets hit the “Amazon Top 100” in Kindle Romantic Suspense, and Naigle went on to publish Out of Focus, book two in the series.

Out of Focus, before being published, placed in numerous contests:  first place, mainstream/literary category in the Maryland Writers’ Association; first place, mainstream category in the CT The Write Stuff Contest; 2010 finalist, single title category in the Silicon Valley RWA Gotcha! Contest; 2010 finalist, novel with romantic elements category in the San Diego RWA Spring Into Romance Contest). Despite being book two in the Adams Grove series, Out of Focus was written before Sweet Tea and Secrets and is the novel that catapulted Naigle forward in her writing career driving her to continue pursuing writing.

In 2012, Naigle signed a four-book deal for the Adams Grove series with Montlake Romance, an Amazon Publishing imprint. Sweet Tea and Secrets along with Out of Focus were re-published by Montlake and Naigle continued to publish four additional books to the series. In August 2013, Naigle’s box set, authored with nine other authors, became a USA Today Bestseller. A year later, she took an early retirement from Bank of America to write full time, and has since penned multiple series such as the Book Creek Novels and the G Team Mysteries. It was book one, In for a Penny, of the G Team series that landed Naigle back on the USA Today Bestsellers list in June 2016.

In March 2017, Naigle’s Christmas Joy sold to Crown Media and Hallmark for their holiday season programming. This kickstarted a current flourishing relationship with Hallmark. Christmas Joy premiered on the Hallmark Channel, November 3, 2018. A second novel, Hope at Christmas, sold to Crown Media and Hallmark and premiered, November 20, 2018. Naigle has also signed deals for the novelization of two Hallmark movies, Christmas in Evergreen (July 10, 2018) and Christmas in Evergreen: Letters to Santa (July 16, 2019), as well as an original novel, The Secret Ingredient (February 12, 2019) which aired on Hallmark Channel as an original movie in February 2020.

Nancy Naigle continues to write small-town romances and keeps her writing diverse by also penning single title novels, holiday-themed novels, short stories, and has co-authored a young adult novel. She is active in several writer organizations including American Christian Fiction Writers, Mystery Writers of America, and International Thriller Writers.

Naigle is represented by The Steve Laube Agency, LLC.

Bibliography
Adams Grove Novels

 Sweet Tea and Secrets (2011)
 Out of Focus (2011)
Wedding Cake and Big Mistakes (2013)
Pecan Pie and Deadly Lies (2013)
Mint Juleps and Justice (2014)
Barbecue and Bad News (2015)

Boot Creek Series

 Life After Perfect (2015)
 Every Yesterday (2016)
 Until Tomorrow (2017)

Seasoned Southern Sleuths (formerly G-Team)

 In For A Penny (2020, re-release)
 Collard Greens & Catfishing (2020, re-release)
 Christmas Cookies & A Confession (2020, re-release)
 Deviled Eggs & Deception (2020, re-release)
 Sweet Tea & Second Chances (2020, re-release)
Fried Pickles & a Funeral (2020, re-release)
Wedding Mints & Witnesses (2020, re-release)

Christmas In Evergreen
 Christmas in Evergreen (2018)
Christmas in Evergreen: Letters to Santa (2019)
 Christmas in Evergreen: Tidings of Joy (2020)

Main Street Romance Series

 Recipe For Romance (2019)

Stand Alone Novels

 inkBLOT (2011)
 Sand Dollar Cove (2015)
 Christmas Joy (2016)
 The Christmas Shop (2019, formally Dear Santa)
 The Secret Ingredient (2019)
 Christmas Angels (2019)
 A Heartfelt Christmas Promise (2020)
 Hope At Christmas (2020, re-release)
 The Shell Collector (2021) (in 2022 this story was released as Fox Nation's first original film.)
 The Wedding Ranch (2022)

Short Works

 Pretty Little Liars:  The Path To Relaxation (2013)
 Pretty Little Liars:  The Liars' Liar (2013)
 Pretty Little Liars:  Secret Talent (2013)
 Wrapped Around Your Heart (2014)
 50 Shades of Cabernet (2017)

Anthologies

 Wild Deadwood Tales (2018)
 Christmas Actually (2020)

References

External links

Living people
American women novelists
21st-century American women writers
21st-century American novelists
American romantic fiction novelists
Women romantic fiction writers
1962 births
Novelists from North Carolina
Writers from Norfolk, Virginia
Bank of America executives
American women bankers
American bankers
Novelists from Virginia